I-18 was one of five Type C cruiser submarines of the C1 sub-class built for the Imperial Japanese Navy. During World War II, she operated as the mother ship for a midget submarine during the attack on Pearl Harbor and the attack of Diego-Suarez, conducted a war patrol in the Indian Ocean, and served in the Guadalcanal campaign before she was sunk in February 1943.

Design and description
They displaced  surfaced and  submerged.

For surface running, the boats were powered by two  diesel engines, each driving one propeller shaft. When submerged each propeller was driven by a  electric motor. They could reach  on the surface and  underwater.

The boats were armed with eight internal bow  torpedo tubes and carried a total of 20 torpedoes. They were also armed with a single /40 deck gun and two single or twin mounts for  Type 96 anti-aircraft guns. They were equipped to carry one Type A midget submarine aft of the conning tower.

Construction and commissioning

Ordered under the 3rd Naval Armaments Supplement Programme and built by the Sasebo Naval Arsenal at Sasebo, Japan, I-18 was laid down on 25 August 1937 with the name Submarine No. 38. Launched on 19 July 1939, she was completed and commissioned on 31 January 1941, by which time she had been renamed I-18.

Service history

Pre-World War II
Upon commissioning, I-18 was attached to the Yokosuka Naval District, assigned to Submarine Division 2 in Submarine Squadron 1 in the 6th Fleet In the autumn of 1941, she underwent conversion into a mother ship for a Type A midget submarine. By 15 November 1941, I-18 was a part of Submarine Division 3 — which also included  and I-20 — in Submarine Squadron 1 in the 6th Fleet.

At the Kure Navy Club in Kure, Japan, on 17 November 1941, the commander of Submarine Division 3 briefed the commanding officers of the five converted submarines on the upcoming attack on Pearl Harbor and on the role of their submarines in it. He had been designated the commander of the Special Attack Unit, made up of all five submarines, each of which was to launch a Type A midget submarine off Pearl Harbor so that the midget submarines could participate in the attack. I-22 was to serve as flagship of the Special Attack unit.

On 18 November 1941, the five submarines moved from Kure to the Kamegakubi Naval Proving Ground, where each embarked a Type A midget submarine. At 02:15 on 19 November 1941, the five submarines got underway from Kamegakubi bound for the Hawaiian Islands, taking a direct route that took them south of Midway Atoll. While at sea, they received the message "Climb Mount Niitaka 1208" from the Combined Fleet on 2 December 1941, indicating that war with the Allies would commence on 8 December 1941 Japan time, which was on 7 December 1941 on the other side of the International Date Line in Hawaii.

World War II

Pearl Harbor
No. 17 was depth charged and sunk with the loss of its two-man crew outside the harbor in Keehi Lagoon. At the request of the Government of Japan, the United States returned the wreck to Japan, where it is displayed at the Naval Academy Etajima in Etajima.

I-18 and the other four "mother" submarines proceeded to the planned recovery area for their midget submarines west of Lanai, where they spent the night of 7–8 December 1941. None of the midget submarines returned. Early on 9 December 1941, I-18, I-20, and I-24 received orders to leave the recovery area. I-18 departed the Hawaiian Islands on 12 December 1941 and arrived at Kwajalein on 22 December 1941.

First war patrol

On 4 January 1942, I-18, I-22, and I-24 departed Kwajalein to begin their first war patrol, assigned patrol areas off the Hawaiian Islands, with the commander of Submarine Division 2 embarked on I-18.

On 18 January 1942, I-18, I-22, and I-24 received orders to depart their patrol areas, the orders calling for I-18 and I-24 to make for the Northwestern Hawaiian Islands and bombard Midway Atoll. On 24 January 1942, I-18 conducted a periscope reconnaissance of Midway, and on 25 January 1942, the two submarines surfaced in darkness off Midway to begin their bombardment. I-24 opened fire with her  deck gun, and United States Marine Corps coastal artillery promptly  returned fire, forcing I-24 to submerge after firing only six rounds. I-18 also submerged without ever having opened fire on the atoll.

After the bombardment attempt, I-18 and I-24 as well as I-22 set course for Japan. Unknown to them, the U.S. submarine  had received Ultra intelligence information alerting her to their activities and routes.

February–April 1942
After her port call at Yokosuka, I-18 moved to Kure, then departed Kure on 18 March 1942. She remained in Japan into April 1942.

During I-18′s stay in Japan, the German naval staff in Berlin formally requested on 27 March 1942 that Japan begin attacks on Allied convoys in the Indian Ocean. On 8 April 1942, the Japanese formally agreed to meet this request by dispatching submarines to operate off the coast of East Africa, and that day they withdrew Submarine Division 1 of Submarine Squadron 8 from its base at Kwajalein to Japan. That morning, the commander of the 6th Fleet, Vice Admiral Teruhisa Komatsu, the commander of Submarine Squadron 8, their staffs, and the midget submarine crews paid a courtesy call on the commander-in-chief of the Combined Fleet, Admiral Isoroku Yamamoto, aboard his flagship, the battleship , at Hashirajima anchorage. After the visit with Yamamoto, the detachment got underway at 11:00, bound for Penang in Japanese-occupied British Malaya.

During the detachment's voyage, 16 United States Army Air Forces B-25 Mitchell bombers launched by the aircraft carrier  struck targets on Honshu in the Doolittle Raid on 18 April 1942. The detachment received orders from the 6th Fleet that day to divert from its voyage and head northeast, passing north of the Bonin Islands, to intercept the U.S. Navy task force that had launched the strike. The detachment failed to find the U.S. ships and soon resumed its voyage.

I-30 and Aikoku Maru called at Penang from 20 April to 22 April 1942 before heading into the Indian Ocean to conduct an advance reconnaissance of the "A" Detachment's planned operating area. The rest of the "A" Detachment reached Penang on 27 April 1942, where the seaplane carrier  — which had undergone modifications allowing her to carry Type A midget submarines — rendezvoused with it. I-16, I-18, and I-20 each embarked a midget submarine at Penang.

Indian Ocean operation

I-18 and the other "A" detachment units got underway from Penang on 30 April 1942, headed westward into the Indian Ocean with I-10 serving as the detachment's flagship. The submarines refueled at sea from Aikoku Maru and Hōkoku Maru on 5, 10, and 15 May 1942. I-18 suffered a mishap on 17 May when her port diesel engine flooded in heavy seas and four of its cylinders seized, damage which prevented her from reaching the launch area for the midget submarines on schedule.

I-10′s Yokosuka E14Y1 (Allied reporting name "Glen") floatplane began reconnaissance flights over ports in South Africa by reconnoitering Durban on 20 May 1942, followed by flights over East London, Port Elizabeth, and Simon's Town over the next week. On the night of 29 May, the plane flew over Diego-Suarez, Madagascar, sighting the battleship  among the ships anchored there. The "A" detachment commander selected Diego-Suarez as the target for a midget submarine attack, scheduled for 30 May 1942.

After the midget submarine attack, the "A" detachment began anti-shipping operations.

On 2 July 1942, I-18 attacked the British 7,406-ton armed merchant ship Phemius. Her torpedoes detonated prematurely, and Phemius opened fire on I-18′s periscope. I-18 escaped undamaged. She was in the Indian Ocean south of St. Lucia Bay, South Africa, on 6 July 1942 when she torpedoed the 7,341-ton British India Steam Navigation Company steamer , which was carrying a large number of survivors of other ships. One hundred fifty-five men survived Mundra′s sinking, which prompted a large number of Royal Air Force and South African Air Force sorties to find I-18, but I-18 went undetected.

I-18 conducted a reconnaissance of Rodrigues on 20 July and of Diego Garcia on 31 July 1942, then proceeded to Penang. As she neared Penang on 2 August 1942, she detected an unidentified enemy — probably Royal Navy — submarine stalking her, but she arrived at Penang safely later that day. She later set course for Japan, arriving at Yokosuka on 23 August 1942 to undergo an overhaul.

Guadalcanal campaign
By mid-November 1942, the Japanese had decided to organize a system of submarine supply runs to Guadalcanal in the Solomon Islands, where Japanese forces had been fighting in the Guadalcanal campaign since August 1942. With her overhaul complete, I-18 got underway from Kure on 17 December 1942 and, after a stop at Truk, proceeded to Shortland Island in the Shortland Islands to begin her supply runs. Grayback′s torpedoes detonated, and Grayback′s commanding officer believed she had sunk I-18, but the torpedoes apparently exploded prematurely, because I-18 submerged and escaped unscathed.

I-18 made three supply runs to Guadalcanal, in each case dropping her cargo off at Cape Esperance on the island's northwest coast. She delivered 15 tons of cargo in supply drums on 5 January 1943 and 25 tons in supply drums on 11 January 1943. On 22 January 1943, she departed Truk on her last supply run, delivering 18 tons of cargo in a supply container at Cape Esperance on 26 January 1943.

On 28 January 1943, I-18 was attached to Submarine Force "A".

The Japanese completed Operation Ke on 8 February 1943. Two of the submarines, including I-18, found and engaged the American force before losing contact with it. Later that day, the commander of Submarine Force A ordered all its submarines except for I-11 and I-17 to proceed to Truk.

Loss

At 15:39, she saw a large bubble of oil and air reach the surface, and she heard a heavy explosion at 15:43. She dropped three more depth charges in the center of the oil slick. After 15:46, she saw cork, wood, and other wreckage rise to the surface in what had become a very large oil slick.

The Japanese declared I-18 missing on the day she was sunk. She was struck from the Navy list on 1 April 1943.

However, Ro-102 conducted patrols from Rabaul after 11 February and reported to Rabaul until 9 May 1943.

Notes

References
 

1939 ships
World War II submarines of Japan
Japanese submarines lost during World War II
Ships built by Sasebo Naval Arsenal
Type C1 submarines
Shipwrecks in the Coral Sea
World War II shipwrecks in the Pacific Ocean
Ships lost with all hands
Maritime incidents in February 1943
Attack on Pearl Harbor
Submarines sunk by United States warships